is an anime created by Tatsunoko Productions.

Plot summary

Robotendon is a strange robot boy who decides to go to a Japanese restaurant in Tokyo called "Gurugurume", where he proposes to work to pay for every meal he plans on having. Very strong and cute, Robotendon moves at the speed of lightning. Curiously, his power source is rice. Robotendon plays the central role in this series, along with the Kamada family, the owners of the restaurant, their son, Gratin, and his girlfriend, Salad Nabu.

Cast

Megumi Hayashibara as Robotendon
Ikue Ōtani as Tabachuko
Jin Yamanoi as Ugarlic
Minami Takayama as Gratin Kamada
Tomoko Kawakami as Salad Nabu

References

External links
 

1995 anime television series debuts
Comedy anime and manga
TV Tokyo original programming
Tatsunoko Production